Matt Whitley (born 20 January 1996) is an English rugby league footballer who plays as a  forward for the Catalans Dragons in the Betfred Super League and the England Knights at international level. 

He previously played for the Widnes Vikings in the Super League.

Background
Whitley was born in Billinge, Merseyside, England.

Career
He made his début for Widnes on 10 April 2015 against the Warrington Wolves, and signed a full-time contract with the club two weeks later.

On 9 October 2021, Whitley played for Catalans Dragons in their 2021 Super League Grand Final defeat against St. Helens.

International career
In July 2018 he was selected in the England Knights Performance squad. Later that year he was selected for the England Knights on their tour of Papua New Guinea. He played against Papua New Guinea at the Oil Search National Football Stadium.

References

External links
Catalans Dragons profile
Widnes Vikings profile
SL profile

1996 births
Living people
Catalans Dragons players
English expatriate rugby league players
England Knights national rugby league team players
English rugby league players
Rugby league players from Billinge, Merseyside
Rugby league second-rows
Widnes Vikings players